Great Short Novels of Adult Fantasy I is an anthology of fantasy novellas, edited by American writer Lin Carter. It was first published in paperback by Ballantine Books in September, 1972 as the fifty-second volume of its Ballantine Adult Fantasy series. It was the eighth such anthology assembled by Carter for the series.

Summary
The book collects four novellas by five fantasy authors, with an overall introduction and notes by Carter. It is a companion volume to Carter's subsequent collection Great Short Novels of Adult Fantasy Volume II (1973).

Contents
"Introduction" (Lin Carter)
"The Wall of Serpents" (Fletcher Pratt and L. Sprague de Camp)
"The Kingdom of the Dwarfs" (Anatole France)
"The Maker of Moons" (Robert W. Chambers)
"The Hollow Land" (William Morris)

Reception
The book was reviewed by Everett F. Bleiler in The Guide to Supernatural Fiction, 1983.

Notes

1972 anthologies
Fantasy anthologies
Lin Carter anthologies
Ballantine Books books